Tyler Mark West (born 1 April 1996) is an English television and radio presenter and DJ. He began his career presenting various shows on CBBC and currently presents weekday afternoons (4-7pm) on Kiss FM. In 2022, he became a contestant on the 20th series of Strictly Come Dancing.

Life and career
Tyler Mark West was born on 1 April 1996 in Sutton, South London. His mother, Debbie works for the NHS.
He went to Carshalton Boys Sports College.  At a young age, he began playing handball and represented the GB National team from a young age. 
He began his entertainment career on children’s television presenting various shows on CBBC, including Match of the Day Kickabout and other features on the channel. Then in 2017, West began presenting MTV News, covering entertainment and trending news on a weekly basis. In 2018, West became one of the presenters of the live trivia game HQ Trivia and between August and November, he presented his own podcast Every Day Hustle, which featured West talking to a new guest each week about their journey of becoming creators, entrepreneurs and inventors.

In 2019, West joined the radio network Kiss FM as a presenter, initially hosting the 7–11pm slot between Monday and Thursday. Six months later, he began presenting on Kiss Drive Time from 4–7pm on Monday to Friday, which he has continued to do so since. In 2020, West presented the podcast for Celebrity Ex on the Beach on MTV and co-hosted the 2020 EE BAFTA Awards red carpet live show in partnership with Facebook. In 2021, West began presenting Flat Out Fabulous on BBC Three, an interior design show for millennials alongside singer and interior designer Whinnie Williams. He was also announced as a presenter for the online series The MTV Movie Show. In August 2022, West was announced to be competing in the twentieth series of the BBC competition series Strictly Come Dancing. Upon joining the line-up, West said he was "so gassed".
On 2 October 2022, West ran the London Marathon in a time of 5 hours 25 minutes, competing to raise money for the charity UK Youth. West had competed in Strictly the previous day and would compete again the following week, eventually being eliminated on 20 November.

References

External links
 
 Tyler West at Kiss FM 

1996 births
British television presenters
British children's television presenters
English radio personalities
Living people
Participants in British reality television series